Sulfobacillus is a genus of bacteria containing six named species. Members of the genus are Gram-positive, acidophilic, spore-forming bacteria that are moderately thermophilic or thermotolerant. All species are facultative anaerobes capable of oxidizing sulfur-containing compounds; they differ in optimal growth temperature and metabolic capacity, particularly in their ability to grow on various organic carbon compounds.

Ecology
Sulfobacillus species are found globally in both natural and artificial acidic environments, such as hot springs, solfatara environments, hydrothermal vents, and in various forms of acid mine drainage. Compared to other bacterial species found in similar acidic environments, Sulfobacillus species are often present at relatively low abundance.

Genome
The genomes of several Sulfobacillus species have been sequenced. Differences between members include genome size and gene content related to sulfur oxidation pathways.

Taxonomy
Sulfobacillus was first described in 1978, along with the type species, Sulfobacillus thermosulfidooxidans. Five additional species have since been described, in at least one case discovered after samples believed to be S. thermosulfidooxidans showed unexpected characteristics.

The genus is of uncertain taxonomic position. It was originally placed in the Clostridiales. It is likely related to the genus Thermaerobacter and may represent either a deep branch of the Bacillota or a separate phylum.

Phylogeny

See also
 List of bacterial orders
 List of bacteria genera

References

Acidophiles